Pierre Imhalsy (14 November 1939 – 17 June 2017) was a Swiss novelist and poet.

Imhasly was born in Visp, Switzerland. He studied German literature in Fribourg and Zurich. His major work is The Rhone Saga an epic poem about the Rhône River. Imhasly was the principal translator of Maurice Chappaz's works. Imhasly died 17 June 2017 from cancer.

Works

 Maithuna: Liebesakt transzendierend - Matterhorn: Berg der Welt. Frankfurt am Main; Basel: Stroemfeld-Verlag, 2005.
 Blick auf ... Zermatt. Ayer: Editions Porte-plumes, 2004.
 Leni, Nomadin. Frankfurt am Main; Basel: Stroemfeld Verlag, 2001.
 Widerpart oder Fuga mit Orgelpunkt vom Schnee: Ein Poem. Frankfurt am Main; Basel: Stroemfeld-Verlag, 2000.
 Paraiso si. Frankfurt am Main; Basel: Stroemfeld-Verlag, 2000.
 Rhone Saga. Basel: Stroemfeld, 1996.
 Alfons Studer oder ein Eros in allen Dingen. Bern: Erpf, 1984.
 Corrida: der spanische Stier und sein Fest. Bern: Erpf, 1982.
 Widerpart oder Fuga mit Orgelpunkt vom Schnee: Ein Poem. Zürich [etc.]: Suhrkamp, 1979.
 Widerpart oder Fuga mit Orgelpunkt vom Schnee. Zürich: Editio Princeps [E. Ammann], 1977.
 Armin: Visp. Variationen & Etüden. Brig: Rotten-Verlag, 1976.
 Heremence Beton = Heremence beton. Lausanne: Editions du Gran-Pont, 1974.
 Sellerie, Ketch up & Megatonnen: Eine Textsammlung. Bern: Kandelaber-Verlag, 1970.

References

External links 
 Switzerland is Different for the Swiss poem
 Pierre Imhasly
 Pierre Imhasly

1939 births
2017 deaths
Swiss male novelists
Swiss poets in German
Swiss male poets
20th-century Swiss novelists
20th-century Swiss poets
20th-century male writers
21st-century Swiss poets
21st-century Swiss novelists
21st-century male writers
People from Visp (district)